Ivan Šaravanja (born 15 March 1995) is a Bosnian professional footballer who plays as a centre-back for Akritas Chlorakas.

Career
Šaravanja began his senior career with the Bosnian club Brotnjo, before moving to the reserves of Admira in 2016. On 16 June 2018, he transferred to Austria Klagenfurt and helped them get promoted into the Austrian Football Bundesliga. He made his professional debut with Austria Klagenfurt in a 1–1 2. Liga tie with Austria Lustenau on 27 August 2018. On 3 July 2021, he joined the Cypriot club Akritas Chlorakas on a free transfer.

References

External links
 
 OEFB Profile

1995 births
Living people
Sportspeople from Mostar
Bosnia and Herzegovina footballers
Croats of Bosnia and Herzegovina
SK Austria Klagenfurt players
NK Brotnjo players
Akritas Chlorakas players
Austrian Football Bundesliga players
2. Liga (Austria) players
Austrian Regionalliga players
Association football defenders
Bosnia and Herzegovina expatriate footballers
Bosnia and Herzegovina expatriate sportspeople in Austria
Expatriate footballers in Austria
Bosnia and Herzegovina expatriate sportspeople in Cyprus
Expatriate footballers in Cyprus